"Life in the Fast Lane" is a song written by Joe Walsh, Glenn Frey and Don Henley, and recorded by American rock band Eagles for the band's fifth studio album Hotel California (1976). It was the third single released from this album, and peaked at No. 11 on the Billboard Hot 100.

Content
The song tells the story of a couple who take their excessive lifestyle to the edge. On In the Studio with Redbeard, Glenn Frey revealed that the title came to him one day when he was riding on the freeway with a drug dealer known as "The Count". Frey asked the dealer to slow down and the response was, "What do you mean? It's life in the fast lane!" In that same interview, Frey indicated that the song's central riff was played by Walsh while the band was warming up in rehearsals and Walsh was told to "keep that; it's a song". Don Henley recalled that the "song actually sprang from the opening guitar riff. One day, at rehearsal, Joe [Walsh] just busted out that crazy riff and I said 'What the hell is that? We've got to figure out to make a song out of that."  Henley and Frey, the primary lyricists for the band, then wrote the lyrics for the song.

Critical reception
Cash Box said that "with the influence of six-stringer Joe Walsh, the Eagles are harder and funkier than ever here."  Record World said that it's "the album's most hard-edged rocker, dominated by a Walsh-signature guitar line."  In 2016, the editors of Rolling Stone rated "Life in the Fast Lane" as the Eagles' eighth-greatest song. In 2017, Billboard ranked the song number four on their list of the 15 greatest Eagles songs, and in 2019, Rolling Stone ranked the song number eight on their list of the 40 greatest Eagles songs.

Personnel

Partial credits from liner notes.

Don Henley - lead vocals, drums
Glenn Frey - backing vocals, clavinet
Joe Walsh - lead guitar, rhythm guitar
Don Felder - lead guitar, rhythm guitar
Randy Meisner - bass guitar, backing vocals

Covers
In 2007, Jill Johnson recorded the song on her album Music Row.

The song was used as the soundtrack for the roller coaster The Eagles' Life In The Fast Lane, which opened at Hard Rock Park in May 2008.

On July 25, 2019 the rock band Hinder released their cover of the song as a non album single.

Charts

Certifications

References

1976 songs
1977 singles
Eagles (band) songs
Jill Johnson songs
Songs written by Glenn Frey
Songs written by Don Henley
Songs written by Joe Walsh
Asylum Records singles
Song recordings produced by Bill Szymczyk
Hinder songs